The France women's national artistic gymnastics team represents France in FIG international competitions.

History
France has participated in the Olympic Games women's team competition 14 times.

Current senior roster

Coaches 
Coaches of INSEP: Martine Georges, Nellu Pop, Alizée Dal Santos and Jérome Martin.
Coaches of Pole France Saint-Etienne: Eric Hagard, Monique Hagard and Marie-Angéline Colson. 
Coach of Pole France Marseille: Emilie Roy. 
Coaches of Avoine Beaumont Gymnastique: Gina Chirilcenco and Marc Chirilcenco.

Olympic Games results

 1928 — 5th place
Mathilde Bataille, Honorine Delescluse, Louise Delescluse, Galuëlle Dhont, Valentine Héméryck, Paulette Houtéer, Georgette Meulebroeck, Renée Oger, Antonie Straeteman, Jeanne Vanoverloop, Berthe Verstraete, Geneviève Vankiersbilck
 1936 — did not participate
 1948 — 10th place
Gisèle Guibert, Colette Hué, Christine Palau, Irène Pittelioen, Jeanine Touchard, Florence Vallée, Jeanette Vogelbacher, Martine Yvinou
 1952 — 12th place
Ginette Durand, Colette Fanara, Colette Hué, Madeleine Jouffroy, Alexandra Lemoine, Liliane Montagne, Irène Pittelioen, Jeanette Vogelbacher
 1956 — did not participate in team competition
Individual competitors: Jacqueline Dieudonné (65th place), Danièle Sicot-Coulon (41st)
 1960 — 12th place
Anne-Marie Demortière, Jacqueline Dieudonné, Renée Hugon, Paulette le Raer, Monique Rossi, Danièle Sicot-Coulon
 1964 — did not participate in team competition
Individual competitors: Monique Baelden (49th place), Jacqueline Brisepierre (64th), Evelyne Letourneur (47th)
 1968 — 7th place
Nicole Bourdiau, Jacqueline Brisepierre, Mireille Cayre, Dominique Lauvard, Evelyne Letourneur, Françoise Nourry
 1972 — 15th place
Nadine Audin, Mireille Cayre, Catherine Daugé, Elvire Gertosio, Pascale Hermant, Véronique Tilmont
 1976 — did not participate in team competition
Individual competitors: Martine Audin (73rd place), Nadine Audin (68th), Chantal Seggiaro (74th)
 1980 — did not participate
 1984 — did not participate in team competition
Individual competitors: Florence Laborderie (28th place), Corinne Ragazzacci (32nd)
 1988 — did not participate in team competition
Individual competitors: Anne-Marie Bauduin (80th place), Karine Boucher (25th), Catherine Romano (73rd)
 1992 — 8th place
Karine Boucher, Karine Charlier, Marie-Angéline Colson, Virginie Machado, Chloé Maigre, Jenny Rolland
 1996 — 8th place
Cécile Canqueteau, Ludivine Furnon, Laure Gély, Isabelle Severino, Elvire Teza, Orélie Troscompt, Émilie Volle
 2000 — 8th place
Anne-Sophie Endeler, Ludivine Furnon, Nelly Ramassamy, Delphine Regease, Alexandra Soler, Elvire Teza
 2004 — 6th place
Coralie Chacon, Soraya Chaouch, Marine Debauve, Émilie Le Pennec, Camille Schmutz, Isabelle Severino	
 2008 — 7th place
Rose-Eliandre Bellemare, Marine Debauve, Laetitia Dugain, Katheleen Lindor, Pauline Morel, Marine Petit
 2012 — 11th place
Mira Boumejmajen, Youna Dufournet, Anne Kuhm, Aurelie Malaussena, Sophia Serseri
2016 — 11th place
Marine Boyer, Marine Brevet, Loan His, Oréane Lechenault, Louise Vanhille
2020 — 6th place
Marine Boyer, Mélanie de Jesus dos Santos, Aline Friess, Carolann Héduit

World Championships results 
1934 — 4th place
Allain, Bourrier, Esposito, Guenerin, Montané, Paon, Ramos, Tarillon

1938 — did not participate

1950 — 2nd place
Ginette Durand, Colette Hué, Madeleine Jouffroy, Alexandra Lemoine, Liliane Montagne, Christine Palau, Irène Pittelioen, Jeanette Vogelbacher

1954 — 9th place
Jacqueline Dieudonné, Monique Gally, Renée Hugon, Madeleine Jouffroy, Alexandra Lemoine, Liliane Montagne, Christiane Richardot, Danièle Sicot-Coulon

1958 — 10th place
Anne-Marie Demortière, Jacqueline Dieudonné, Arlette Gilbert, Annie Glanchar, Renée Hugon, Danièle Sicot-Coulon

1962 — 12th place
Annie Ange, Jacqueline Dieudonné, Renée Hugon, Paulette Le Raer, Michéle Melenec, Danièle Sicot-Coulon

1966 — 7th place
Pierrette Aymar, Jacqueline Brisepierre, Mireille Cayre, Dominique Lauvard, Huguette Leguet, Evelyne Letourneur

1970 — 14th place
Chantal Challe, Nicole de Santi, Anne Flescher, Dominique Lauvard, Sylvie Peteau, Chantal Puard

1974 — 14th place
Nadine Audin, Catherine Boulet, Catherine Daugé, Pascale Hermant, Patricia Olszakowski, Chantal Seggiaro

1978 — 12th place
Martine Audin, Nadine Audin, Valérie Fiandrino, Anne Hervé, Martine Pidoux, Véronique Sanguinetti

1979 — 15th place
Béatrice Doucet, Valérie Fiandrino, Valérie Grandjean, Anne Hervé, Martine Pidoux, Véronique Sanguinetti

1981 — did not participate in team competition

1983 — 16th place
Sophie Bernard, Véronique Guillemot, Patricia Martin, Valérie Micheli, Cécile Pellerin, Sandrine Vacher

1985 — 18th place
Sophie Darrigade, Nathalie Donati, Carole Grison, Véronique Guillemot, Florence Laborderie, Valérie Le Gall

1987 — 13th place
Anne-Marie Bauduin, Karine Boucher, Sophie Darrigade, Sandrine Livet, Catherine Romano, Sandrine Villanne

1989 — 13th place
Anne-Marie Bauduin, Karine Boucher, Karine Mermet, Carole Micheli, Ingrid Stutz, Sandrine Villanne

1991 — 11th place
Karine Boucher, Virginie Machado, Chloé Maigre, Jenny Rolland, Barbara Solans, Ingrid Stutz

1992 — no team competition
Individual competitors: Marie-Angéline Colson, Mélanie Legros, Virginie Machado, Chloé Maigre, Ingrid Stutz

1993 — no team competition
Individual competitors: Eleonore Couffe, Mélanie Legros

1994 (individual) — no team competition
Individual competitor: Élodie Lussac

1994 (team) — 7th place
Cécile Canqueteau, Anne Etienne, Laure Gély, Élodie Lussac, Christelle Marconnet, Frédérique Marotte, Carine Muntoni

1995 — 6th place
Laetitia Bégué, Cécile Canqueteau, Ludivine Furnon, Laure Gély, Isabelle Severino, Elvire Teza, Orélie Troscompt

1996 — no team competition
Individual competitors: Ludivine Furnon, Isabelle Severino, Elvire Teza

1997 — 5th place
Cécile Canqueteau, Ludivine Furnon, Magali Ruffato, Isabelle Severino, Elvire Teza, Émilie Volle

1999 — 8th place
Anne-Sophie Endeler, Ludivine Furnon, Nelly Ramassamy, Alexandra Soler, Elvire Teza, Émilie Volle

2001 — 12th place
Clélia Coutzac, Ludivine Furnon, Magaly Hars, Elisa Pasquet, Delphine Regease, Nelly Soupé

2002 — did not participate

2003 — 10th place
Coralie Chacon, Soraya Chaouch, Marine Debauve, Émilie Le Pennec, Gaelle Richard, Camille Schmutz

2005 — no team competition
Individual competitors: Marine Debauve, Émilie Le Pennec, Isabelle Severino

2006 — 10th place
Jenny Kohler, Katheleen Lindor, Lindsay Lindor, Julie Martinez, Erika Morel, Isabelle Severino

2007 — 6th place
Laetitia Dugain, Katheleen Lindor, Pauline Morel, Marine Petit, Isabelle Severino, Cassy Vericel

2009 — no team competition
Individual competitors: Youna Dufournet, Pauline Morel

2010 — 11th place
Marine Brevet, Aurélie Malaussena, Eva Maurin, Pauline Morel, Marine Petit

2011 — 10th place
Rose-Eliandre Bellemare, Marine Brevet, Clara Della Vedova, Youna Dufournet, Aurélie Malaussena, Sophia Serseri

2013 — no team competition
Individual competitors: Mira Boumejmajen, Valentine Sabatou

2014 — 13th place
Mira Boumejmajen, Marine Brevet, Clara Chambellant, Manon Cormoreche, Youna Dufournet, Claire Martin

2015 — 10th place
Marine Brevet, Loan His, Anne Kuhm, Claire Martin, Valentine Pikul, Louise Vanhille

2017 — no team competition
Individual competitors: Marine Boyer, Lorette Charpy, Mélanie de Jesus dos Santos, Coline Devillard

2018 — 5th place
Juliette Bossu, Marine Boyer, Lorette Charpy, Mélanie de Jesus dos Santos, Louise Vanhille

2019 — 5th place
Marine Boyer, Lorette Charpy, Mélanie de Jesus dos Santos, Aline Friess, Claire Pontlevoy

2021 - no team competition
Individual competitors: Coline Devillard, Celia Serber, Carolann Heduit

2022 — 8th place
Marine Boyer, Mélanie de Jesus dos Santos, Coline Devillard, Aline Friess, Carolann Héduit, Morgane Osyssek-Reimer

Most decorated gymnasts
This list includes all French female artistic gymnasts who have won a medal at the Olympic Games or the World Artistic Gymnastics Championships.

See also 
List of Olympic female artistic gymnasts for France

References

Gymnastics in France
National women's artistic gymnastics teams
Women's national sports teams of France